Caroline Wuillot (born 2 July 1971) is a Belgian former tennis player.

She has career-high WTA rankings of 219 in singles, achieved on 5 April 1993, and 284 in doubles, reached on 03 September 1990. Her only WTA Tour main-draw appearance came at the 1992 Belgian Open. She defeated Ukrainian Elena Brioukhovets in the first round. She was defeated in the second round by her French opponent, Sybille Niox-Château, in straight sets.

ITF finals

Singles: 3 (1–2)

Doubles: 3 (3–0)

References

External links 
 

1971 births
Living people
Belgian female tennis players